The 2015 Baghdad market truck bombing was a truck bomb attack on 13 August 2015, targeting a Baghdad food market in Sadr City, a predominantly Shi'ite neighborhood.

Attack
On 13 August 2015, shortly after 06:00 local time (03:00 UTC), a bomb-packed refrigeration truck was detonated in Sadr City. , at least 76 people were confirmed to have been killed in the bombing, with at least 212 more injured. The market in the Shi'ite neighborhood is one of the biggest in Baghdad selling wholesale food items. This incident caused much resent against the government for the continued terror attacks in the city.

Responsibility
Islamic State of Iraq and the Levant (ISIL) claimed responsibility for the attack, stating that "God has enabled the soldiers of the Islamic State to detonate a parked, booby-trapped truck amid a gathering of apostates in one of their most important Shiite majority strongholds, in Sadr City." According to the group, the attack targeted members of Iraq's Popular Mobilization Forces, largely comprising Shi'ite militias allied with the Iraqi government. However, CNN reported the top United Nations official in Iraq, Gyorgy Busztin, as saying that the victims were "innocent civilians."

Aftermath
In response to the attack, local residents attacked police and security responders, blaming the government for continued attacks in Baghdad.

Shiite lawmaker Hakim al-Zamili, head of Iraq's parliamentary security committee, called for a review of security procedures, including the establishment of local patrols, as well as enhancing the country's intelligence capabilities.

See also

 2015 Khan Bani Saad bombing
 List of Islamist terrorist attacks
 List of terrorist incidents, 2015
 List of terrorist incidents linked to ISIL
 Timeline of the Iraq War (2015)
Persecution of Shias by the Islamic State

References

2015 murders in Iraq
21st-century mass murder in Iraq
Marketplace attacks in Iraq
Mass murder in 2015
Suicide car and truck bombings in Iraq
Suicide bombings in Baghdad
Terrorist incidents in Iraq in 2015
ISIL terrorist incidents in Iraq
Terrorist incidents in Sadr City
2010s in Baghdad